Moya is an Irish and Spanish female given name. 

Notable people with the name include:

Moya Brady (born 1962), British actress
Moya Brennan (born 1952), Celtic folk singer
Moya Cannon (born 1956), Irish author
Moya Cole (1918–2004), Northern Irish medical doctor and oncological researcher
Moya Doherty (born 1957), Irish entrepreneur
Moya Dyring (1909–1967), Australian artist
Moya Greene, Canadian civil servant, President and CEO of Canada Post
Moya Henderson (born 1941), Australian music composer
Moya Lear (1915–2001), American businesswoman and wife of aviation pioneer Bill Lear